List of national men's football teams may refer to:

 List of men's national association football teams
 List of International Rugby League members
 List of international rugby union teams